is a Japanese professional footballer who plays as a midfielder for  club Roasso Kumamoto.

Career statistics

Club
.

Honours

 Individual
J2 League Best XI: 2022

References

External links

Profile at Roasso Kumamoto

1998 births
Living people
Japanese footballers
Association football midfielders
Fukuoka University alumni
J2 League players
J3 League players
Roasso Kumamoto players